It was the first edition of the tournament.

An-Sophie Mestach and Nina Stojanović won the title, defeating Emma Laine and Kotomi Takahata in the final, 6–4, 7–5.

Seeds

Draw

References
Main Draw

TEB Kültürpark Cup - Doubles